This is an incomplete list of titles in the book series, Seminar Studies in History.

1960s 
The Levellers. Howard Shaw, 1968. 
Tudor Rebellions. Anthony Fletcher, 1968. (Revised by Diarmaid Macculloch 2004)

1970s 
Gladstone, Disraeli and Later Victorian Politics. Paul Adelman, 1970. (2nd edn 1983, 3rd 1997)
Slavery in the American South. John White & Ralph Willett, 1970. 
King John and Magna Carta. J.A.P. Jones, 1971. 
Radical Politics, 1790–1900: Religion and Unbelief. Edward Royle, 1971. 
The Rise of the Labour Party 1880–1945. Paul Adelman, 1972.
Revolution & Terror in France 1789–1795. D.G. Wright, 1974. 
The Scramble for Africa, M.E. Chamberlain, 1974. 
The Weimar Republic. John Hiden, 1974. (Second edition 1996)
The Russian Revolution. Anthony Wood, 1979. (Second edition 1986)

1980s 
British Foreign Policy in the Age of Palmerston. M.E. Chamberlain, 1980. 
Chartism. Edward Royle, 1980. 
Unemployment in Britain Between the Wars. Stephen Constantine, 1980. 
The 1848 Revolutions. Peter Jones, 1982. 
The Decline of the Liberal Party, 1910–31. Paul Adelman, 1982. 
The English Republic, 1649–60. Toby Barnard, 1982.
Spain's Civil War. Harry Browne, 1983. 
Stalin & Stalinism. Martin McCauley, 1983.
The Glorious Revolution. John Miller, 1983. 
The Reign of Mary I. Robert Tittler, 1983.
Henry VIII. M.D. Palmer, 1984. 
Lancastrians and Yorkists: The Wars of the Roses. David Cook, 1984. 
The Dissolution of the Austro-Hungarian Empire, 1867–1918. John Mason, 1985.
The Thirty Years War. Peter Limm, 1985. 
Bismarck and Germany, 1862–90. David G. Williamson, 1986. 
The Origins of the First World War. Gordon Martel, 1987. 
War in Europe, 1939–45. Anthony Wood, 1987. 
Social Change and Continuity in Early Modern England, 1550-1750, Barry Coward, 1988. 
Peel and the Conservative Party 1830–1850. Paul Adelman, 1989.
The Dutch Revolt 1559–1648. Peter Limm, 1989. 
The Eastern Question, 1774–1923. A.L. Macfie, 1989. 
The English Reformation 1530–1570. W.J. Sheils, 1989. 
The Pre-Reformation Church in England, 1400–1530. Chistopher Harper-Bill, 1989.

1990s 
The Protestant Reformation in Europe. Andrew Johnston, 1991. 
War and Society in Britain 1899–1948. Rex Pope, 1991. 
The Conservative Party and British Politics 1902–1951. Stuart Ball, 1995.
The English Civil War 1640–1649. Martyn Bennett, 1995.
Poverty and Poor Law Reform in Nineteenth-Century Britain, 1834–1914: From Chadwick to Booth. David Englander, 1998.
The British Economy since 1914: A Study in Decline?. Rex Pope, 1998. 
The First World War, Stuart Robson, 1998. 
The Origins of the Second World War, R.J. Overy, 1998. 
Decolonisation: The British Experience since 1945. Nicholas White, 1999.
The Arab-Israeli Conflict. Kirsten E. Schulze, 1999.

2000s 
Britain and Ireland: From Home Rule to Independence. Jeremy Smith, 2000.
Lenin's Revolution: Russia, 1917–1921, David R. Marples, 2000.
The Truman Years, 1945–1953. Mark S. Byrnes, 2000.
The Vietnam War. Mitchell K. Hall, 2000.
Facisim and the Right in Europe 1919-1945. Martin Blinkhorn, 2000.  
Austria, Prussia and Germany, 1806–1871, John Breuilly, 2002. 
The Crusades 1095–1197. Jonathan Phillips, 2002.
The Third Reich, David G. Williamson, 2002. 
A Short History of Iraq: From 636 to the Present. Thabit Abdullah, 2003. 
The French Revolution: 1787-1804, P.M. Jones, 2003. 
The Soviet Union under Brezhnev. William J. Tompson, 2003.
The Birth of Industrial Britain: Social Change, 1750–1850, Kenneth Morgan, 2004.

2010s
The League of Nations and the Organization of Peace. Martyn Housden, 2012.

References

Seminar Studies
Longman books